Novourusovka is a rural locality (a selo) and the administrative center of Buzansky Selsoviet, Krasnoyarsky District, Astrakhan Oblast, Russia. The population was 1,145 as of 2010. There are 24 streets.

Geography 
Novourusovka is located 37 km northwest of Krasny Yar (the district's administrative centre) by road. Belyachy is the nearest rural locality.

References 

Rural localities in Krasnoyarsky District, Astrakhan Oblast